Eugoa pulverosa is a moth of the family Erebidae. It is found in China.

References

 Natural History Museum Lepidoptera generic names catalog

pulverosa
Moths described in 1937